A street fair celebrates the character of a neighborhood. As its name suggests, it is typically held on the main street of a neighborhood.

The principal component of street fairs are booths used to sell goods (particularly food) or convey information. Some include carnival rides and parades. Many have live music and dance demonstrations.

Fairs typically range no more than a few blocks long, although some fairs, such as the 9th Avenue International Food Festival in New York City and the Solano Stroll in Northern California, extend more than a mile. A fair only one block long is commonly called a block party.

Variety
Street fairs vary greatly in character, even within one city. Annual street fairs in Seattle, Washington, for example, include the University District Street Fair that feature the work of craftspeople and require that the person who make the goods that are for sale must be present in their own booths. The Fremont Fair features crafts from around the world, as well as the Summer Solstice Parade and Pageant, famed for its painted naked cyclists. In the same city, the Capitol Hill Block Party fences off several blocks, charges admission, and features some of the city's best known rock bands, while the Chinatown-International District Summer Fair has a distinctly Asian-American and Pacific Islander flavor, with taiko drummers, martial arts demonstrations and Hawaiian dance.

In Belgium, street fairs are known as braderies, which translates to roasting, referencing the frequent roasting of meat at the events.

List of street fairs

 Atlantic Antic 
 Braderie de Lille 
 Boishakhi Mela
 Castro Street Fair 
 Chorley cake Street Fair 
 Dekalb County Free Fall Fair
 Ephrata Fair 
 Feast of San Gennaro 
 Festa do Albariño 
 Folsom Europe 
 Folsom Street Fair 
 Gentse Feesten 
 Giglio Society of East Harlem 
 How Weird Street Faire 
 Kentucky Avenue Renaissance Festival 
 Lesbian and Gay City Festival 
 Lilac Festival (Calgary) 
 Northalsted Market Days 
 Solano Avenue Stroll 
 St Crispin Street Fair 
 St Giles' Fair 
 Sunset Junction Street Fair 
 Taste of Arlington 
 Up Your Alley Fair
 Ohio Festival and Events Association lists Ohio fairs

Gallery

See also

 Festival
 Food festival
 Renaissance fair

References

 
Fairs
Street culture